Bassillac et Auberoche is a commune in the department of Dordogne, southwestern France. The municipality was established on 1 January 2017 by merger of the former communes of Bassillac (the seat), Blis-et-Born, Eyliac, Le Change, Milhac-d'Auberoche and Saint-Antoine-d'Auberoche.

Population

See also 
Communes of the Dordogne department

References 

Communes of Dordogne